Kristin Cecilie Karlsen is a Norwegian handball player. She played 33 matches for the national handball team in 1990. She participated at the 1990 World Women's Handball Championship, where the Norwegian team placed sixth.

References

Year of birth missing (living people)
Living people
Norwegian female handball players
20th-century Norwegian women